The Spur Hill transmission site is located to the south of the city of Cork, Ireland, just north west of Cork airport, on a hill with a 137 metre elevation.

The transmitter was initially opened in 1965 as a VHF television relay of the main Mullaghanish television transmitter in County Cork, with FM radio transmission later being added to provide a relay of the national radio channels,

On its conversion to UHF television transmission in 1996, it became the main transmitter serving Cork city, carrying the four Irish analogue channels, RTÉ One (Ch53), RTÉ Two (Ch57), TV3 (Ch60), and TG4 (Ch63) at an effective radiated power (ERP) of 20 kW from a 60 metre steel lattice mast.

On 24 October 2012 all analogue television transmission ended in Ireland, and the station now provides the Irish DTT service Saorview to Cork city and environs. It is owned and operated by 2RN, a subsidiary  of the Irish national broadcaster RTÉ.

Current transmissions

Digital television

FM radio

Spur Hill relay transmitter

References

External links 
 www.rtenl.ie
 saorview.ie

Transmitter sites in Ireland